Wesley Stuart Leaper (October 23, 1900 – January 30, 1958) was an American football end for the Green Bay Packers of the National Football League (NFL). He played college football at Wisconsin

Biography
Leaper was born Wesley Stuart Leaper on October 23, 1900 in Green Bay, Wisconsin.

See also
Green Bay Packers players

References

1900 births
1958 deaths
Green Bay Packers players
Wisconsin Badgers football players
Sportspeople from Green Bay, Wisconsin
Players of American football from Wisconsin